Roeweritta carpentieri is a species of harvestmen in a monotypic genus in the family Phalangiidae.

References

Harvestmen
Harvestman genera
Monotypic arachnid genera